Disturbed is an American heavy metal band which was formed when guitarist Dan Donegan, drummer Mike Wengren and bassist Steve "Fuzz" Kmak hired vocalist David Draiman in 1996.

Over the course of its career, Disturbed has earned two Grammy nominations, one Billboard Music Award nomination and one iHeartRadio Music Awards nomination. Overall, Disturbed has received 7 awards from 30 nominations.

Billboard Music Award

|-
| 2006 || Disturbed || Rock Artist of the Year ||

Grammy Awards

The Grammy Awards are awarded annually by the National Academy of Recording Arts and Sciences. Disturbed received one nomination in 2009, but did not win. They received another nomination in 2017.

|-
| 2009 || "Inside the Fire" || Best Hard Rock Performance || 
|-
| 2017 || "The Sound of Silence" (Live) || Best Rock Performance ||

iHeartRadio Music Awards

|-
| 2016 || Disturbed || Rock Artist of the Year || 
|-
| 2017 || Disturbed || Rock Artist of the Year || 
|-
| 2017 || rowspan="2"| The Sound of Silence || Rock Song of the Year || 
|-
| 2017 || Best Cover Song ||

Metal Hammer Golden Gods Awards

The Metal Hammer Golden Gods Awards are awarded annually by the British music magazine Metal Hammer. Disturbed's guitarist Dan Donegan has been nominated once.

|-
| 2008 || Dan Donegan || Best Shredder ||

Revolver Golden Gods Awards

The Revolver Golden Gods Awards are awarded annually by the American music magazine Revolver. Disturbed's guitarist Dan Donegan has been nominated once.

|-
| 2011 || Dan Donegan || Best Guitarist ||

Loudwire Music Awards

The Loudwire Music Awards have been awarded annually by the American online magazine Loudwire since 2011.

|-
| 2015 || The Vengeful One || Video Countdown Hall of Fame || 
|-
| 2015 || Disturbed || Classic Cage Match Hall of Fame || 
|-
| 2015 || Immortalized || Best Rock Album || 
|-
| 2015 || rowspan="2"| The Vengeful One || Best Rock Song || 
|-
| 2015 || Best Rock Video || 
|-
| 2015 || rowspan="2"| Disturbed || Best Rock Band || 
|-
| 2015 || Most Devoted Fans || 
|-
| 2015 || David Draiman || Best Vocalist || 
|-
| 2015 || Dan Donegan || Best Guitarist || 
|-
| 2015 || John Moyer || Best Bassist || 
|-
| 2015 || Mike Wengren || Best Drummer || 
|-
| 2015 || David Draiman || Rock Titan || 
|-
| 2016 || Down with the Sickness || Best  Metal Song of the 21st Century || 
|-
| 2017 || rowspan="2"| The Sound of Silence || Best Rock Song || 
|-
| 2017 || Best Rock Video ||

Spike Guys' Choice Awards

|-
| 2007 || Disturbed || Ballsiest Band ||

SiriusXM Octane Music Awards

|-
| 2015 || Disturbed || Artist of the Year || 
|-
| 2015 || Disturbed || Most Devoted Fans || 
|-
| 2015 || Immortalized || Album of the Year ||

Octane’s Year-End Awards

|-
| 2016 || Disturbed || Artist of the Year ||

References

Awards
Lists of awards received by American musician
Lists of awards received by musical group